Glen Niven is a locality in the Southern Downs Region, Queensland, Australia. It is within the Granite Belt on the Darling Downs and adjacent to the border with New South Wales.

Geography 
The locality is within the Granite Belt on the Darling Downs. The South Western railway line forms the western boundary of the locality while the border with New South Wales forms the eastern boundary. There is a lake created by impounding Four Mile Creek. The land is used for farming.

History 
The locality was named and bounded on 15 December 2000. It presumably takes its name from the Glen Niven railway station, which was named after Laurence Niven, who was a manager at one of the tin mines in the area.

References 

Southern Downs Region
Localities in Queensland